Athens–Lavrion Railway (Σιδηροδρομική Γραμμή Λαυρίου - Αγίων Αναργύρων) was a  railway line connecting downtown Athens with Eastern Attica and the mining town of Lavrion in Greece.

Attica Railways (1882–1926)

The contract between the Greek government and the Hellenic Company of Lavrion Metallurgies was signed in 1882. A new company, Attica Railways, was founded to take over the new line.

The main line to Lavrion was officially opened on 20 June 1885, although the section Keratea–Lavrion was in limited use before that date.

In 1889 the line was extended by  towards the center of Athens, to a station located at Lavrion Square, near Omonoia Square. The section between Lavrion Square and Attica remained in use until 1926, when it was replaced by a tram line.

All sections were single track, with passing loops at most stations.

The main rolling stock depot and repair workshop were located at Attiki station, with additional facilities at Lavrion.

A short, single-track spur branched off at a junction located  beyond Heraklion station, followed by a 90° right curve and ending at Kalogreza or Nea Alexandreia station. The branch line was constructed in or just after 1944  and served the local brown coal (lignite) mines of Kalogreza. It was closed in 1957, sharing the fate of Athens–Lavrion railway. There are no visible traces of the tracks left. Another branch line served Cambas Winery at Leontarion (Kantza). In the Lavrion mining area the line connected with the industrial networks of the two mining companies.

In 1910 Attica Railways were taken over by the Hellenic Electric Company.

Rolling stock

The passenger service to Lavrion consisted of two trains in each direction per day. The trains were hauled by Tubize 0-6-2T steam locomotives, delivered between 1885 and 1889. Between 1900 and 1925 ten 2-6-0T locomotives were procured in four batches: one from Vassiliadis Works in Piraeus, and the remaining nine from Krauss in Germany. Two additional Tubize 0-6-2T locomotives were bought from Thessaly Railways in 1919 and were converted to 2-6-2T.

Part of Piraeus, Athens and Peloponnese Railways (1929–1962)

In 1926 the lines to Lavrion and Kifissia was taken over by the Electric Transport Company, a member of Power and Traction Finance Company. In 1929 the line from Heraklion to Lavrion was transferred to the Piraeus, Athens and Peloponnese Railways (SPAP).

Under SPAP operation service to Lavrion departed from Athens Peloponnese Station. Between 1929 and 1931 SPAP trains would access the Lavrion line at Attiki station using a temporary short connection crossing the standard gauge line north of Athens Central ("Larissis") station.

SPAP took possession of the ten 2-6-0T (Vassiliadis/Krauss) locomotives while the remaining ones were used by IEM for the Attiki–Kifissia–Strofyli service.

In 1944 the line was damaged and wasn't reopened until 1952, with three trains in each direction on weekdays and an extra passenger train on weekends. Service was provided by Uerdingen/MAN railbuses.  Freight trains still used steam traction.

The line was closed to passenger traffic in 1957, due to political lobbying by private bus owners. Limited freight and special passenger trains ran for a few more years. In 1962 the connection between Kato Liosia and Heraklion was severed due to the construction of the new Athens–Thessaloniki highway and the line was abandoned.

Preservation

Small sections of the line survive at various locations.

Reopening
In 2016 a nine-station,  extension of the Athens Suburban Railway beyond Koropi station was announced. The extension to Lavrio will connect 300,000 more people to the rail network at a cost of €350 million.

See also

 Lavrion Square-Strofyli railway
 Attica Railways
 Piraeus, Athens and Peloponnese Railways

Notes

References

Railway lines in Greece
Defunct railroads
Railway lines opened in 1885
Railway lines closed in 1962
1885 establishments in Greece
1962 disestablishments in Greece
Metre gauge railways in Greece
Rail transport in Attica